Surfing Magazine, originally titled International Surfing Magazine, was a magazine that was founded in 1964 by Orange County local Dick Graham and surf photographer Leroy Grannis. Later the magazine was acquired by Adrian B. Lopez, a New York magazine publisher who relocated the magazine to the east coast. Eventually the title became Surfing Magazine and moved to Southern California.

In 1980, Australian millionaire Clyde Packer bought the magazine after leaving his native Australia and settling in Laguna Beach and ultimately, Santa Barbara. The magazine moved its offices to San Clemente where it was published for more than 15 years before being purchased by Primedia, and later purchased again by supermarket magnate Ron Burkle's Source Interlink. Always in competition with nearby Surfer Magazine, ultimately both magazines came under the ownership of Source Interlink.

In November 1995, the magazine's Senior Editor Skip Snead worked with Santa Cruz aerial innovator Shawn "Barney" Barron to develop the Surfing Magazine "Airshow" an aerial surfing competition.

Surfing Magazine was the official magazine for Vans Triple Crown of Surfing and the National Scholastic Surfing Association. Many popular features include Annual Green Issue and Annual Swimsuit Issue, Shaper of the Year, and International Surfing Day.

In January 2017, the magazine's owners, TEN: The Enthusiast Network, announced that Surfing Magazine would cease its print edition and its digital assets would be folded into fellow TEN title and longtime competitor Surfer.  The last issue of the magazine appeared in January 2017.

Notes

External links
 Official Surfing Magazine Website

Monthly magazines published in the United States
Sports magazines published in the United States
Magazines established in 1964
Magazines disestablished in 2017
Magazines published in California
Surfing magazines
Surfing in the United States
Defunct magazines published in the United States